Oerlenbach station is a railway station in Oerlenbach, Bavaria, Germany.

References

Railway stations in Bavaria
Buildings and structures in Bad Kissingen (district)